Lynne Procope is a Trinidadian-born American poet. She is one of the founders of the louderARTS Project. In 1998, Procope made the 1998 Nuyorican Poetry Slam team. She and her fellow Nuyorican team members Alix Olson, Steve Coleman and Guy LeCharles Gonzalez would go on to win the 1998 National Poetry Slam Championship that year in Austin, TX. This championship would lead to Soft Skull Press publishing the anthology Burning Down the House which showcased poetry by Olson, Procope, Coleman and Gonzalez as well as poetry by the 1998 Nuyorican Team's coach, Roger Bonair-Agard. Her best known poems include "Elemental Woman", "Flectere" and "Evidence of Injury". Her writing focuses on the human experience of women and marginalized groups.

Bibliography
Burning Down the House, 2000, Soft Skull Press, co-authored with Roger Bonair-Agard, Stephen Colman, Guy Lecharles Gonzalez, and Alix Olson.
"Shine (for Joe Bataan)," "All Night," 2015, Haymarket Books, Contributor, Edited by Kevin Coval.

References

External links
The PiperJaneProject
The louderARTS Project
Lynne Procope louderARTS poet page
 Audio of "Elemental Woman," "Lace and Knife: A Conspiracy Tale of the South," and "Butterfly Nut House (for Peter James Conti)" (among others) on Indiefeed Performance Poetry Channel

Living people
Trinidad and Tobago emigrants to the United States
American women poets
Year of birth missing (living people)
21st-century American women